Máximo Hugo Fjellerup (born November 25, 1997) is an Argentine professional basketball player for Bàsquet Girona of Liga ACB. At a height of 1.98 m (6'6") tall, he plays at the shooting guard and small forward positions.

Professional career
In his pro career, Fjellerup has played in both the 2nd-tier South American League, and the 1st-tier FIBA Americas League.

National team career
Fjellerup has been a member of the senior Argentine national team. With Argentina, he played at the 2017 FIBA AmeriCup, where he won a silver medal. In 2019, he took part in the team that won the Pan American gold medal in Lima. He was included in the Argentine squad for the 2019 FIBA Basketball World Cup and clinched silver medal with Argentina which emerged as runners-up to Spain at the 2019 FIBA Basketball World Cup.

In 2022, Fjellerup won the gold medal in the 2022 FIBA AmeriCup held in Recife, Brazil. He didn´t play too many minutes, but he was one of the Argentina´s squad shooting guards in the tournament.

References

External links
 Máximo Fjellerup at fiba.com
 Máximo Fjellerup at latinbasket.com

1997 births
Living people
2019 FIBA Basketball World Cup players
Argentine men's basketball players
Basketball players at the 2019 Pan American Games
Bàsquet Girona players
Estudiantes de Bahía Blanca basketball players
Medalists at the 2019 Pan American Games
Pan American Games gold medalists for Argentina
Pan American Games medalists in basketball
People from Tres Arroyos
San Lorenzo de Almagro (basketball) players
Shooting guards
Small forwards
Sportspeople from Buenos Aires Province